A chatbot is a computer program designed to simulate an intelligent conversation.

Chatbot may also refer to:

 ChatBot, a platform for designing bots sold by Livechat Software
 IRC bot, an automated program on Internet Relay Chat draw me

See also
 Turing test
 Dialog system
 Interactive online characters